NASA Astronaut Group 14 ("The Hogs") was a group of 24 astronauts announced by NASA on 31 March 1992. The group's name derived from The Muppet Show skit "Pigs in Space" and from the group's sponsorship of a pot-bellied pig at the Houston Zoo.

Pilots
Scott J. Horowitz (born 1957), U.S. Air Force (4 flights)
STS-75 
STS-82 
STS-101 
STS-105 

Brent W. Jett, Jr. (born 1958), U.S. Navy (4 flights)
STS-72 
STS-81 
STS-97 
STS-115 

Kevin R. Kregel (born 1956), U.S. Air Force (4 flights)
STS-70 
STS-78 
STS-87 
STS-99 

Kent V. Rominger (born 1956), U.S. Navy (5 flights)
STS-73 
STS-80 
STS-85 
STS-96 
STS-100

Mission Specialists
Daniel T. Barry (born 1953), Scientist (3 flights)
STS-72 
STS-96 
STS-105 

Charles E. Brady, Jr. (1951-2006), U.S. Navy (1 flight)
STS-78 

Catherine Coleman (born 1960), U.S. Air Force (3 flights)
STS-73 
STS-93 
Soyuz TMA-20
Expedition 26/27

Michael Gernhardt (born 1956), Bioengineer (4 flights)
STS-69 
STS-83 
STS-94 
STS-104 

John Grunsfeld (born 1958), Physicist (5 flights)
STS-67 
STS-81 
STS-103 
STS-109 
STS-125 

Wendy B. Lawrence (born 1959), U.S. Navy (4 flights)
STS-67 
STS-86 
STS-91 
STS-114 

Jerry Linenger (born 1955), U.S. Navy (2 flights)
STS-64 
STS-81  (Launched to MIR)
STS-84  (Returned from MIR)

Richard Linnehan (born 1957), Veterinarian (4 flights)
STS-78 
STS-90 
STS-109 
STS-123 

Michael Lopez-Alegria (born 1958), U.S. Navy (5 flights)
STS-73 
STS-92 
STS-113 
Soyuz TMA-9 (Launch vehicle for Expedition 14)
Expedition 14
Axiom Mission 1 (Private spaceflight to the ISS)

Scott Parazynski (born 1961), Physician (5 flights)
STS-66 
STS-86 
STS-95 
STS-100 
STS-120 

Winston Scott (born 1950), U.S. Navy (2 flights)
STS-72 
STS-87 

Steven Smith (born 1958), Engineer (4 flights)
STS-68 
STS-82 
STS-103 
STS-110 

Joseph Tanner (born 1950), U.S. Navy (4 flights)
STS-66 
STS-82 
STS-97 
STS-115 

Andy Thomas (born 1951), Engineer (4 flights)
STS-77 
STS-89  (Launched to MIR)
STS-91  (Returned from MIR)
STS-102 
STS-114 

Mary Weber (born 1962), Scientist (2 flights)
STS-70 
STS-101

International Astronauts
Marc Garneau (born 1949), Royal Canadian Navy (3 flights)
STS-41-G 
STS-77 
STS-97 

Chris Hadfield (born 1959), Royal Canadian Air Force (3 flights)
STS-74 
STS-100 
Soyuz TMA-07M (Launched to ISS)
Expedition 34 (Last part of expedition)
Expedition 35 (All of expedition)

Maurizio Cheli (born 1959), Italian Air Force (1 flight)
STS-75 

Jean-François Clervoy (born 1958), Engineer (3 flights)
STS-66 
STS-84 
STS-103 

Koichi Wakata (born 1963), Engineer (3 flights)
STS-72 
STS-92 
STS-119  (Launched to ISS)
Expedition 18 (Last part of expedition)
Expedition 19 (All of expedition)
Expedition 20 (Part of first 6 man crew on ISS)
STS-127  (Returned from ISS)

References

External links
Astronaut Biographies

NASA Astronaut Corps
Lists of astronauts